Stéphane Bruey (1 December 1932 – 31 August 2005) was of Polish descent and a professional Association football striker. He was part of the France squad during the 1958 World Cup tournament.

Honours
1958 FIFA World Cup third place with France

References

External links
 Player statistics at the French Football Federation's official web site

1932 births
2005 deaths
People from Champigny-sur-Marne
French footballers
France international footballers
Association football forwards
1958 FIFA World Cup players
Racing Club de France Football players
AS Monaco FC players
Angers SCO players
Olympique Lyonnais players
Ligue 1 players
French people of Polish descent
Footballers from Val-de-Marne